The Liumao mine is one of the largest graphite mines in China and in the world. The mine is located in the north of the country in Inner Mongolia. The mine has estimated reserves of 28.3 million tonnes of ore 16% graphite.

References 

Graphite mines in China